Skenea divae is a species of minute sea snail, a marine gastropod mollusk in the family Skeneidae.

Description
The common size of the shell of species is 0.5 mm.

Distribution
This species occurs in the Mediterranean Sea.

References

 Carrozza F. & van Aartsen J.J. (2001). Skenea divae sp. nov., a new skeneimorph Gastropod from the Mediterranean. La Conchiglia 299: 37–38
 Templado, J. and R. Villanueva 2010 Checklist of Phylum Mollusca. pp. 148-198 In Coll, M., et al., 2010. The biodiversity of the Mediterranean Sea: estimates, patterns, and threats. PLoS ONE 5(8):36pp.

External links
 Molluschi Marini: Skenea divae

divae
Gastropods described in 2001